John Wilkinson, alternatively known as Jack Wilkinson, was an English footballer from Durham City. He played as an outside left in the Football League for Watford. He made his debut in Watford's first ever Third Division South match, a 0–0 draw with Swansea City on 27 August 1921. He was a first-team regular in the 1921–22 and 1922–23 seasons, but made only three non-consecutive appearances in the following campaign, and was released in May 1924. He joined Hartlepools United for the following season, but did not make a League appearance for them.

References 

Year of birth missing
Year of death missing
Place of death missing
Sportspeople from Durham, England
Footballers from County Durham
Association football outside forwards
English footballers
Watford F.C. players
Hartlepool United F.C. players
English Football League players